Lebia cyanocephala, sometimes called the blue plunderer, is a ground beetle from a subfamily of Harpalinae.

Description
The head and elytra are metallic blue.The pronotum is orange.

Distribution
Widespread in Europe but rare. The northern boundary of the distribution area goes through southern England , southern Norway , southern Sweden and southern Finland . The southern limit of the range runs through western North Africa and reaches Israel in Asia Minor . Of the Mediterranean islands, the beetle is only known from Sicily and Cyprus . The species occurs across the Palearctic to the east as far as Siberia and northern China.

References
Content in this edit is translated from the existing German Wikipedia article at :de:Lebia cyanocephala; see its history for attribution.

Lebia
Beetles of Europe
Beetles described in 1758
Taxa named by Carl Linnaeus